The men's heavyweight (91 kilograms) event at the 2014 Asian Games took place from 26 September to 3 October 2014 at Seonhak Gymnasium, Incheon, South Korea.

Like all Asian Games boxing events, the competition was a straight single-elimination tournament. All bouts consisted of three three-minute rounds. 

A total of 12 men from 12 countries competed in this event, heavyweight competition, limited to fighters whose body weight was less than 91 kilograms.

Anton Pinchuk of Kazakhstan won the gold medal. He beat Ali Mazaheri from Iran 3–0 on points in the final bout at the Seonhak Gymnasium.

Ihab Al-Matbouli from Jordan and Park Nam-hyeong from host nation South Korea shared the bronze medal after losing in the semifinal.

Schedule
All times are Korea Standard Time (UTC+09:00)

Results

References

Results

External links
Official website

Boxing at the 2014 Asian Games